South of the Rio Grande may refer to:

 South of the Rio Grande (1945 film), an American western film
 South of the Rio Grande (1932 film), an American Pre-Code western film